St. Matthew's Church is a protected church located in the Vasastaden district of Stockholm, Sweden. Originally intended to be used as a chapel in the Adolf Fredrik Parish, it was designed by Erik Lallerstedt and built in 1901–1903, at an intersection in Vasastaden.

The large hall at ground floor was first meant to be used for various charitable activities, as the chapel was located in a poor working-class neighbourhood at the time. The building is reminiscent in many ways of St Peter's Church in Norrmalm, a Methodist church also designed by Lallerstedt in 1899. Some changes were made in 1907–1908, under guidance of the original architect, when the parish was split and the chapel was turned into a parish church.

See also
 List of churches in Stockholm

References

External links 

 

20th-century Church of Sweden church buildings
Art Nouveau church buildings in Sweden
Churches in Stockholm
Churches in the Diocese of Stockholm (Church of Sweden)
Churches completed in 1903
Art Nouveau architecture in Stockholm